The name Greg has been used for ten tropical cyclones worldwide: seven in the Eastern Pacific Ocean, two in the Australian region, and one in the Western Pacific.

In the Eastern Pacific:
 Hurricane Greg (1981)  – churned in the open ocean.
 Hurricane Greg (1987) – paralleled the Mexican coast while remaining far offshore
 Hurricane Greg (1993) – continuation of Atlantic Tropical Storm Bret.
 Hurricane Greg (1999) – made landfall in Baja California Sur
 Tropical Storm Greg (2005) – short-lived storm that remained well offshore.
 Hurricane Greg (2011) – stayed out to sea.
 Tropical Storm Greg (2017) – churned in the open ocean.

In the Australian region:
 Cyclone Greg (1990) – developed in the Gulf of Carpentaria.
 Cyclone Greg (2017) (30U) – developed north-east of the Cocos Islands.

In the Western Pacific:
 Tropical Depression Greg (1996) (43W) – made landfall on northern Borneo in the Malaysian state of Sabah, causing over $280 million in damage (1996 USD) and 238 deaths.

Pacific hurricane set index articles
Pacific typhoon set index articles